

François Édouard Anatole Lucas (4 April 1842 – 3 October 1891) was a French mathematician.  Lucas is known for his study of the Fibonacci sequence. The related Lucas sequences and Lucas numbers are named after him.

Biography
Lucas was born in Amiens and educated at the École Normale Supérieure. He worked in the Paris Observatory and later became a professor of mathematics at the Lycée Saint Louis and the  Lycée Charlemagne in  Paris.

Lucas served as an artillery officer in the French Army during the Franco-Prussian War of 1870–1871.

In 1875, Lucas posed a challenge to prove that the only solution of the Diophantine equation

with N > 1 is when N = 24 and M = 70. This is known as the cannonball problem, since it can be visualized as the problem of taking a square arrangement of cannonballs on the ground and building a square pyramid out of them. It was not until 1918 that a proof (using elliptic functions) was found for this remarkable fact, which has relevance to the bosonic string theory in 26 dimensions. More recently, elementary proofs have been published.

He devised methods for testing the primality of numbers. In 1857, at age 15, Lucas began testing the primality of 2127 − 1 by hand, using Lucas sequences. In 1876, after 19 years of testing, he finally proved that 2127 − 1 was prime; this would remain the largest known Mersenne prime for three-quarters of a century. This may stand forever as the largest prime number proven by hand. Later Derrick Henry Lehmer refined Lucas's primality tests and obtained the Lucas–Lehmer primality test.

He worked on the development of the umbral calculus.

Lucas was also interested in recreational mathematics. He found an elegant binary solution to the Baguenaudier puzzle. He also invented the Tower of Hanoi puzzle in 1883, which he marketed under the nickname N. Claus de Siam, an anagram of Lucas d'Amiens, and published for the first time a description of the Dots and Boxes game in 1889.

Lucas died in unusual circumstances. At the banquet of the annual congress of the Association française pour l'avancement des sciences, a waiter dropped some crockery and a piece of broken plate cut Lucas on the cheek. He died a few days later of a severe skin inflammation probably caused by sepsis. He was only 49 years old.

Works
 Recherches Sur Plusieurs Ouvrages De Léonard De Pise Et Sur Diverses Questions D’Arithmétique Supérieure (1877)
 Récréations scientifiques (1880)
 Théorie des nombres, Tome Premier (1891)
 Récréations mathématiques (1894)
 L'arithmétique amusante (1895)

See also
 Lucas pseudoprime
 Lucas–Carmichael number
 Pell-Lucas numbers

References

 
.
Harkin, D. “On the Mathematical Works of Francois-Édouard-Anatole Lucas,  Enseignement mathematique, 2nd ser., 3 (1957), 276–288.

External links

Scans of Lucas's original Tower of Hanoi puzzle in French, with translations
Édouard Lucas, by Clark Kimberling
Édouard Lucas

1842 births
1891 deaths
19th-century French mathematicians
Number theorists
École Normale Supérieure alumni
Fibonacci numbers
Recreational mathematicians
Mathematics popularizers
Deaths from sepsis
People from Amiens